The national emblem of the Adjar Autonomous Soviet Socialist Republic was adopted in 1922 by the government of the Adjar Autonomous Soviet Socialist Republic. The emblem is identical to the emblem of the Georgian Soviet Socialist Republic.

History 
The First Congress of Soviets of the ASSR of Adjara, which was held from January 10 to January 14, 1922, adopted the first Constitution of the ASSR of Adjara. The print of the constitution in 1922 shows the form of the emblem of the Adjar ASSR.

Second revision 
In the Constitution of the Adjar Autonomous Soviet Socialist Republic, adopted on October 25, 1937 by the All-Adjar Congress of Soviets, the emblem of the Adjar ASSR was described in Article 111 of the constitution :

Third revision 
After the adoption of the new Constitution of the Adjar ASSR in 1978, the inscription in the Georgian language “Adjar ASSR” began to be placed against the background of a picture of the mountains.

Gallery

References 

Adjar ASSR
Adjar ASSR
Adjar ASSR
Adjar ASSR
Adjar ASSR
Georgian SFSR
Adjar ASSR
Adjar ASSR